The C&C SR 21 is a Canadian racing sailboat that was designed by Glenn Henderson and first built in 1992. It was introduced under the name SR MAX.

Production
The design was built by C&C Yachts starting in 1992, but it is now out of production.

Design
The SR 21 is a racing keelboat, built predominantly of fibreglass. It has a fractional sloop rig, a raked stem, an open reverse transom, an internally-mounted spade-type rudder controlled by a tiller and a lifting fin keel. It displaces  and carries  of ballast.

The boat may be fitted with a small outboard motor for docking and maneuvering.

The design has a PHRF racing average handicap of 165 with a high of 174 and low of 159.

See also
List of sailing boat types

Related development
C&C SR 25
C&C SR 27
C&C SR 33

Similar sailboats
Capri 22
J/22

References

Keelboats
1990s sailboat type designs
Sailing yachts
Sailboat type designs by Glenn Henderson
Sailboat types built by C&C Yachts